Garifuna Settlement Day is a public holiday in Belize, celebrated each year on November 19. The holiday was created by Belizean civil rights activist, Thomas Vincent Ramos, in 1941. It was recognized as a public holiday in the southern districts of Belize in 1943, and declared a national holiday in 1977. The holiday celebrates the settlement of the Garifuna people in Belize after being deported from the Grenadines by the British. The major festivities for the holiday occur in the town of Dangriga, including parades, street music, and traditional dancing.

See also
Garifuna history
Garifuna people
Dangriga
Punta Gorda

Garifuna settlement

References

External links
Garifuna Heritage Foundation
Garífuna life in Belize from the BBC News
What about Garifuna Settlement Day? on mybelize.net
Garifunas
Garifuna Settlement Day 2020, 2021 and 2022
Garifuna
Public holidays in Belize
November observances